Jiefang (解放街道) is a sub-district in Dinghai District, the centre of Zhoushan Island (Downtown Zhoushan City), the People's Republic of China. It is named after Jiefang Road (解放路), or Liberation Road, which crosses the entire sub-district.

 Sub-district seat: Jiefang Fangzong Building, 157 West Jiefang Road (解放西路157号解放综合大楼)
 Area: 5 km2
 Population: 48,181 in 18359 households permanently, 15,000 including temporary residents

Subdivisions
The sub-district contains 19 residential committees and 1 administrative village (Maoling)  (see Administrative divisions of the People's Republic of China#Levels).

Pop. = Population (2001)

Neighbours
 East: Chengdong Sub-district at East Huancheng Road (环城东路)
 South: Huannan Sub-district at Donghai Road (东海路)
 West: Yancang Sub-district at Zhu and Yu Hills (竹山、芧岭)
 North: Changguo Sub-district at Tangkangwan Road (滕坑湾路)

Buildings
Established in October 1988, the sub-district contains:
 10,000 m2 commercial buildings
 People's Daily Commercial Building (民生商厦)
 The food market Zhongzhou (中洲实业公司付食品市场)
 Majiahe Restaurant (马佳和饭店)

By 2000, there were 200 private-owned businesses in Jiefang, with an annual income of 140,000,000 yuan.

Township-level divisions of Zhejiang
Zhoushan